XL or variants may stand for:

Arts and entertainment
 XL (band), a J-Pop band
 XL Recordings, a British independent record label
 XL, a character in the animated series Buzz Lightyear of Star Command

Businesses and organizations

Transportation
 XL Airways France, a French airline
 XL Airways Germany, a German charter airline
 XL Leisure Group, a major United Kingdom tour operator, which ceased operations in 2008
 XL Airways UK, a defunct British airline which was part of XL Leisure Group
 LAN Ecuador (IATA airline code XL)
 the base trim level for Ford trucks

Other businesses and organizations
 XL Axiata, an Indonesian mobile phone network operator
 XL Center, a civic center in Hartford, Connecticut, United States
 XL Cola, a Swedish soft drink
 XL Group, a financial services company headquartered in Ireland with executive offices in Bermuda
 XL Recordings, a British independent record label
 Excel Esports, a British esports organization (shortened name is "XL")
 North Texas Intermediate Sanctions Facility, a privately operated prison facility (TDCJ shorthand is "XL")

Science and technology
 XL, inductive reactance, a property of an inductor
 XL (programming language), a computer programming language designed to support concept programming
 XL series computers, in the Atari 8-bit family (including the 600XL, 800XL and 1200XL)
 Weather Star XL (also known as just XL), a computer used by The Weather Channel for local forecasts
 Nintendo DSi XL, the fourth and final model in the Nintendo DS line, released in 2009, and a larger version of the Nintendo DSi
 Nintendo 3DS XL, the second model in the Nintendo 3DS line, released in 2012, and a larger version of the original Nintendo 3DS
 New Nintendo 3DS XL, the fifth model in the Nintendo 3DS line, released in 2014, and a larger version of the Nintendo 3DS XL and New Nintendo 3DS (which is a larger version of the original 3DS)
 New Nintendo 2DS XL, the sixth model in the Nintendo 3DS line, released in 2017, and a larger version of the Nintendo 2DS

Other uses
 40 (number) in Roman numerals
 XL (Extra large), a clothing size
 Excess-of-loss reinsurance, a particular non-proportional type of reinsurance contact

See also 
 Excel (disambiguation)